This is a list of rulings from the Constitutional Court of Spain against laws from the Parliament of Catalonia. From 2012, the Spanish Government has filed 32 appeals with the Constitutional Court of Spain against Catalan laws, both against legal rulings linked to the Catalan independence movement as well as appeals against Catalan laws to stop energy poverty or related to commercial and business hours.

References 

Law of Spain
Catalonia-related lists
Parliament of Catalonia
Spain law-related lists